Sunset Song is a 1971 BBC Scotland adaptation of Lewis Grassic Gibbon's novel of the same name for television.

It consists of six episodes of around 45 minutes each.  The series was the first colour drama made by BBC Scotland, and also contained the first nude scene. The series made the important change from the novel of turning Chris Guthrie, the main character, into the narrator.  It was shown in the USA on Masterpiece Theatre in 1975–76. The composer Thomas Wilson was commissioned to write the theme music, which the BBC retained for the remaining two parts of the trilogy A Scots Quair, commissioning Wilson again to compose the incidental music for the remaining productions of Cloud Howe and Grey Granite.

Chris Guthrie was played by Vivien Heilbron.  The cast included several other leading Scottish actors of the time, including Andrew Keir,  Edith MacArthur, Anne Kristen, Roddy McMillan, Alex McAvoy and John Grieve.  The script was by Bill Craig, and it was directed by Moira Armstrong.

In September 2022 the serial was repeated on BBC Four, available for 11 months on BBC iPlayer.  There is also a short introduction filmed in 2022 where Heilbron and Armstrong discuss the serial.

References

BBC television dramas
1971 British television series debuts
1971 British television series endings
Adaptations of works by Scottish writers